Newton Kulundu (June 30, 1948 – March 7, 2010) was a Kenyan politician. He was the Minister of Labour and Human Resource Development in the Ministry of Labour (2006–2008), and a Member of Parliament in Lurambi Constituency (2002–2007).

Career
After Newton graduated from Kakamega School (1965–1968), and Kenyatta College (1969–1970), he joined the Ministry of Health where he served as a Senior Medical Officer of Health in Kisumu, Kwale, Lamu and Kisii Districts. He was involved in the training of technical staff in the ministry’s expanded immunisation program activities all over the country, and assisted in the formulation of health policy under the district focus for rural development program.

He later held a master’s degree in Public Health from Loma Linda University in Southern California, United States. He was appointed Senior Company Doctor with the Brooke Bond Company (1984–1997), where he designed and implemented an award-winning reproduction health program. He becomes a past chairman of the parliamentary Committee on Health, Housing, Labour and Social Welfare, and organizing a health conference for Members of Parliament when President Daniel Moi declared HIV/Aids a national disaster.

Dr. Kulundu first entered parliament as the Member of Parliament for Lurambi constituency in 1997 on a Ford-Kenya Ticket. In 2002, he was re-elected to parliament and was initially appointed the minister for Environment, Natural Resources and Wildlife, before being appointed minister for Labour, a position he held till 2007.

Dr. Kulundu will be remembered for his verbal exchange with a foreign diplomat in a public forum (directed against US Ambassador Michael Ranneberger) on 24 October 2007 while launching a report entitled "Trafficking in Persons from a Labour Perspective, the Kenyan experience".

Death
Newton Kulundu died on March 7, 2010.

References

 
 

1948 births
2010 deaths
Kenyan Luhya people
Members of the National Assembly (Kenya)
Loma Linda University alumni
Environment ministers of Kenya
Labour ministers of Kenya
Forum for the Restoration of Democracy – Kenya politicians
Alumni of Kakamega School